Fenny Compton is a village and parish in Warwickshire, England, about eight miles north of Banbury. In the 2001 census the parish had a population of 797, increasing to 808 at the 2011 census. Its name comes from the Anglo-Saxon Fennig Cumbtūn meaning "marshy farmstead in a valley".

In 1498 Sir William Cope, who served as Cofferer of the Household of Henry VII from 1494 to 1505 (in the absence at that time of a Treasurer of the Household he carried out the duties of that office as well), was granted the Lordships of Wormleighton and Fenny Compton, part of the lands of Simon de Montford who had been attainted in 1495. He later sold the lands to the Spencer family, later of Althorpe. The Parish church of St Peter and St. Clare was built in the 13th century and is a Grade II* listed building. 

The village has a doctor's consulting-room, a small Co-op Food store, a popular local pub located centrally and another pub on the outskirts. The old part of the village has many notable buildings including the Woad House, Knotts Cottage, the Red House, the Old School House and the Hollies.

The GWR station and SMJ station were built alongside each other controlled by a joint signal box.

The village was struck by an F0/T1 tornado on 23 November 1981, as part of the record-breaking nationwide tornado outbreak on that day.

See also
Banburyshire

References

External links

https://web.archive.org/web/20050901200128/http://www.bmsgh.org/parish/warw/tyaiw/fennycompton.html
http://www.warwickshirerailways.com/index.htm

Villages in Warwickshire